Bukovec may refer to:

Places

Croatia
Bukovec, a village in the municipality of Selnica, Međimurje County
Bukovec Zelinski, a village, Zagreb County
Mali Bukovec, a municipality and village, Varaždin County
Veliki Bukovec, a municipality and village, Varaždin County

Czech Republic
Bukovec (Frýdek-Místek District), a municipality and village, Moravian-Silesian Region
Bukovec (Plzeň-South District), a municipality and village, Plzeň Region
Bukovec, a village and part of Dubá, Liberec Region
Bukovec, a village and part of Kamenný Újezd (České Budějovice District), Plzeň Region
Bukovec, a village and part of Plzeň, Plzeň Region

Romania
Bukovec, the Hungarian name for Bucovăţ village, Dumbrava Commune, Timiș County

Slovakia
Bukovec, Košice-okolie District, a municipality and village, Košice Region
Bukovec, Myjava District, a municipality and village, Trenčín Region
Pohronský Bukovec, a municipality and village, Banská Bystrica Region
Bukovec Mountains

Slovenia
Bukovec, Slovenska Bistrica, a settlement in the Municipality of Slovenska Bistrica
Bukovec, Velike Lašče, a settlement in the Municipality of Velike Lašče
Bukovec pri Poljanah, a settlement in the Municipality of Ribnica

People
Anton Žerdín Bukovec, Slovenian priest
Brigita Bukovec, Slovenian athlete

See also
Bukovets (disambiguation)
Bukovac (disambiguation)
Bucovăț (disambiguation)
Bukowiec (disambiguation)